Nurol Holding is an industrial conglomerate in Turkey operating in the construction, defence manufacturing, energy, investment banking and tourism industries. Its core business is construction; Nurol Construction was founded in 1966. It is privately owned, with equal shares held by three members of the Çarmıklı family. The Holding was established in 1989.

The company's 35th anniversary celebration in 2001 was attended by former Prime Minister and President of Turkey Suleyman Demirel. In 2007, it considered entering the media sector by participating in the Sabah-ATV tender, but decided it against it after reviewing the companies' financials.

Companies
Nurol's companies include:
 Nurol Construction and Trading (Nurol İnşaat ve Ticaret A.Ş.) 
 Projects include the İzmit Bay Bridge, and leadership of the Ilısu Dam construction consortium
 Nurol Makina (Nurol Makina ve Sanayi A.S., founded 1976) - industrial and defence manufacturing
 Products include the Nurol Ejder and the TOMA water cannon
 FNSS Defence Systems (FNSS Savunma Sistemleri A.Ş.) - defence manufacturing; a joint venture with BAE Systems Inc.
 Products include the FNSS Pars, ACV-300, and AZMİM.
 Nurol Technologies
 Products include boron-carbide armour
 Nurol Yatırım Bankası - investment banking based in Maslak
 Nurol Real Estate (Nurol Gayrimenkul Yatırım Ortaklığı, quoted on the Istanbul Stock Exchange as NUGYO)
 Notable investments include Hurriyets headquarters, acquired for $127m in 2012
 Turser (tourism)
 Owns Sheraton Turkey, which includes the Sheraton Ankara

References

External links
Official Website

Conglomerate companies of Turkey
Companies based in Ankara
Turkish companies established in 1989
Holding companies established in 1989
Holding companies of Turkey